Lincraft is a retail chain in Australia that specialises in the sale of homewares, including crafts, material, and patterns. As of October 2022, it has 48 locations around Australia and New Zealand.

Lincraft (formerly Suzanne Silks) was nurtured by three generations of the Ross family before current owners John Maguire and Brian Swersky established Lincraft Australia in 2005. Lincraft was founded in 1938 by Leo Ross as a stall shop in Melbourne. In 2005, Lincraft was in receivership due to a slump in Christmas sales.

In 2010, the Australian Competition & Consumer Commission (ACCC) reported that Lincraft had sold imported  bathrobes which failed to meet safety and labelling standards, but that they accepted Lincraft's efforts to prevent similar occurrences in the future. In July 2007, Lincraft closed its second store in Townsville.

References

External links
 Lincraft website

Retail companies of Australia
Retail companies of New Zealand
Retail companies established in 1938
1938 establishments in Australia
Australian companies established in 1938